A sleeper agent, also called sleeper cell, is a spy who is placed in a target country or organization not to undertake an immediate mission, but instead to act as a potential asset if activated. Even if not activated, the "sleeper agent" is still an asset and can still play an active role in sedition, espionage, or possibly treason by virtue of agreeing to act if activated. Sleeper agents may also work in groups of a clandestine cell system with other agents.

In espionage
In espionage, a sleeper agent is one who has infiltrated into the target country and has "gone to sleep", sometimes for many years. The agent does nothing to communicate with the sponsor or any existing agents or to obtain information beyond what is in public sources. The agent acquires jobs and identities, ideally ones that will prove useful in the future, and attempts to blend into everyday life as a normal citizen. Counterespionage agencies in the target country cannot, in practice, closely watch all those who may possibly have been recruited some time before.

In a sense, the best sleeper agents are those who do not need to be paid by the sponsor, as they are able to earn enough money to finance themselves, averting any possibly traceable payments from abroad. In such cases, the sleeper agent may be successful enough to become what is sometimes termed an "agent of influence".

Sleeper agents who have been discovered have often been natives of the target country who moved elsewhere in early life and were co-opted (perhaps for ideological or ethnic reasons) before returning to the target country. That is valuable to the sponsor, as the sleeper's language and other skills can be those of a native, thus less likely to trigger domestic suspicion.

Choosing and inserting sleeper agents has often been difficult, as whether the target will be appropriate some years in the future is uncertain. If the sponsor government and its policies change after the sleeper has been inserted, the sleeper may be found to have been planted in the wrong target.

Notable examples
 Jack Barsky was planted as a sleeper agent in the United States by the Soviet KGB. He was an active sleeper agent between 1978 and 1988. He was located by US authorities in 1994 and then arrested in 1997. Barsky quickly confessed after being arrested and became a useful source of information about spy techniques.
 The Illegals Program is a network of sleeper spies planted in the US by the Russian Foreign Intelligence Service. An ongoing, multiyear investigation culminated in June 2010 with the filing of charges and the arrest of 10 suspects in the US and another in Cyprus. The Russian General Directorate for special programs, or GUSP in Russian transliteration (Главное управление специальных программ, ГУСП), still recruits candidates among students and talented scientists to use them as sleeper agents or as legal employees in police and intelligence bodies in Russia.

In fiction
Sleeper agents are popular plot devices in fiction, particularly in espionage fiction and science fiction. This common use is directly related to and results from repeated instances of real-life "sleeper agents" participating in spying, espionage, sedition, treason, and assassinations.

In fictional portrayals, sleeper agents are sometimes unaware that they are sleepers. They are brainwashed, hypnotized, or otherwise conditioned to be unaware of their secret mission until activated. Examples of such stories are:
 In The Manchurian Candidate (the novel and its film adaptations), some Americans are captured by Soviet intelligence forces, given posthypnotic commands, and returned to their lives in the U.S.
 In the 1977 film Telefon, Russian agents believe they are ordinary Americans until their memories are unlocked with a special activation phrase.
 The 1978 book Eye of the Needle by Ken Follett and 1981 film of the same name both show how a sleeper agent, Henry Faber (Donald Sutherland), operates in his target country.
 The 1997 book Captain Underpants has elementary schoolers George and Harold hypnotize their school's principal, so when he hears anybody snap their fingers, he takes on the persona of the titular Captain Underpants.
 In the 2010 film Salt, an accused sleeper agent goes on the run to try to clear her name, only to discover she actually is a sleeper agent.
 The film Killers, also released in 2010, has an assassin trying to leave his life as a government operative behind by getting married and living a domestic life, but he is then followed by many killers, who are near the end revealed to be sleeper agents working for his father-in-law, himself a former assassin.
 The 2010 video game Call of Duty: Black Ops has the main character is brainwashed by the Soviet Union during the Cold War, along with others to be sleeper agents and detonate a deadly gas across the USA when activated.
 In the 2012 film Thuppakki and its 2014 remake Holiday: A Soldier Is Never Off Duty, the sleeper cells attack the city of Mumbai.
 The 2013 film Viswaroopam has an unravelling plot where the sleeper agents are scraping cesium from oncological equipment to build and trigger a dirty bomb in New York City.
 The 2013–2018 television series The Americans has an average American family acting as a group of KGB agents. It is set during the Cold War in the 1980s.
 In the 2015 film American Ultra, small-town stoner Mike Howell spends most of his time getting high and writing graphic novels. What Mike does not know is that he was trained by the CIA to be a lethal killing machine. When the agency targets him for termination, his former handler activates his latent skills, turning the mild-mannered slacker into a deadly weapon.
 The 2021 film Black Widow involves a large connection of Russian sleeper cells in the United States during the Cold War, with the goal of raising and brainwashing adopted girls, eventually bringing them to Russia, where they are trained into Black Widow operatives.
 In the 2021 film Girl Next, a woman is abducted, drugged, and brainwashed to become an obedient, living sex doll. Later, she is shown to be an assassin programmed to destroy the traffickers.

See also

 Double agent
 Mole (espionage)
 Resident spy
 Silent majority

Notes

References

Spies by role

fr:Agent dormant